David White (fl. late 14th-century) was the member of the Parliament of England for Salisbury for multiple parliaments from 1378 to September 1388.

References 

Members of Parliament for Salisbury
English MPs 1378
Year of birth unknown
Year of death unknown
English MPs October 1382
English MPs October 1383
English MPs 1385
English MPs 1386
English MPs September 1388